Erler Film is a Turkish movie production company established in 1960 in Istanbul by the renowned Turkish film director and producer Türker İnanoğlu. Based today in Kavacık, Beykoz, it is the oldest film company in the country, which is still in business today.

For more than 45 years, Erler Film produced feature films in a wide spectrum, from black-and-white to color movies, from domestic to co-productions, from history movies to comedies. During the 1960s and 1970s, it was the biggest Turkish film production company. From 1990 on, it started producing TV series for the Turkish television channels with the taste of cinema.

It produced more than 200 movies, among them 21 in co-production with Greece, Italy and Iran.

TV series on air
  Cennet Mahallesi (The Paradise Quarter) Saturdays at 20:00 on Show TV
 Yabancı Damat Fridays at 20:00 on Kanal D
 The Borders of Love (Greek version of the same series) Mondays at 21:00 on Greek Mega TV
 Ölümüne Sevdalar (Deadly Loves) Show TV

References
 Official website

Mass media companies established in 1960
Film production companies of Turkey
Turkish companies established in 1960